Chiltern Park Aerodrome was a private airfield near Woodcote and Ipsden in Oxfordshire. It was within RAF Benson's Military Aerodrome Traffic Zone.

The airfield was established in 1988, and it catered for gyroplanes, microlights, helicopters, and gliders, as well as general aircraft. In 2011 it became the weekend home of London Parachute School.

The airfield was ordered to close in June 2021, with the official closing date being 24 September after 33 years of operation. The closure of the airfield was ordered by a local farmer and his wife, who own the land on which the airfield is sited, and live close by. The couple complained about the venture growing "too big over the years", and that the noise of the aircraft "disturbs families living nearby".

The Booker Gliding Club formerly operated at the airfield, as they weren't able to operate at their home airfield of Wycombe Air Park due to legal disputes between the leaseholder of the airfield and the council.

Activities at the Aerodrome
The aerodrome was home to the London Parachute School, where they utilised the airfield for skydiving training in the form of tandem jumps. They operated in conjunction with Booker Gliding Club who used the airfield for gliding 7 days a week when the weather was suitable.

Gallery

References

External links 
 

Airports in England
Transport in Oxfordshire
Airports in South East England